Fulford is a historic village and civil parish on the outskirts of York, in the York district, in the ceremonial county of North Yorkshire, England. 
to the south of the city, on the east bank of the River Ouse, it was the site of the Battle of Fulford won by the invading Vikings in 1066, a precursor to the nearby Battle of Stamford Bridge lost by the Vikings, and then the Battle of Hastings in Sussex won by the invading Normans in the following weeks. The population of the civil parish at the 2011 census was 2,785.

It is home to Imphal Barracks, headquarters of the British Army's 15th Infantry Brigade; soldiers and their families live in married quarters outside the barracks. Fulford is a headquarters for the Royal Military Police.

History
St Oswald's Hall, the former church, was built about 1150, on a site near the Ouse, west of the current village centre.  A new St Oswald's Church was built, on a different site, in 1866, and the old church also survives.

Cavalry barracks were established in Fulford as early as 1795 but these have now been largely demolished. The infantry barracks, now known as Imphal Barracks were built between 1877 and 1880.

Fulford Cross, a 15th-century Grade II listed  boundary cross stands opposite the barracks, beyond the present parish boundary. The cross has been removed, but an octagonal shaft on a three-stepped pedestal remains.

In 1823 Fulford, known as "Fulford Gate",  was a village in the parish of Fulford Ambo in the East Riding of Yorkshire and the Wapentake of Ouse and Derwent. Population at the time was 182, with occupations including two farmers, two blacksmiths, two wheelwrights, two shoemakers, a butcher, a tailor, a shopkeeper, a coal dealer, a corn miller, and the landlords of The Light Horseman, The Saddle, The Board, The Plough, and The Bay Horse public houses. Also within the village was a druggist, a manufacturing chemist, a schoolmaster, nine gentlemen, three gentlewomen, two bankers and seven yeomen. A school existed for 20 boys and girls.

The ancient parish of Fulford consisted of two townships, Gate Fulford (also known as Over Fulford) in the north and Water Fulford (also known as Nether Fulford) to the south.  From the two townships the parish took the name of Fulfords Ambo in the 19th century.  The two townships became separate civil parishes in 1866.  In 1900 the civil parish of Gate Fulford was abolished and absorbed into the city of York.  The civil parish of Water Fulford was renamed Fulford in 1935.

In 1974 Fulford was transferred from the East Riding of Yorkshire to Selby District in the new county of North Yorkshire.  In 1996 the parish was transferred to the City of York unitary authority.

Geography and governance

According to the 2001 Census the parish had a population of 2,595. The modern village incorporates the old settlements of Water Fulford to the south and Gate Fulford on the road to York. The current civil parish is co-terminous with the unitary authority ward boundary. The parish is much reduced in size, having once extended north up the A19 past Fulford Barracks as far as Heslington Road and including York Cemetery. Between Fulford and the university is Walmgate Stray. Low-lying land near the River Ouse is prone to flooding.

The parish council maintains a website with local information which includes a directory of organisations and shops, a list of links and contact details for services, a guide to local issues and a record of parish council minutes.

Education

Schools in the area include St. Oswald's Primary School and Fulford School, a Mathematics and Computing College.

Transport
Fulford main street is the A19. Near the intersection stands the York Designer Outlet shopping mall. A pedestrian Millennium Bridge with a cycle path was opened in 2001, linking Fulford to the South Bank area of York on the other side of the river. Several bus services operate between York and Fulford.

Sport

Fulford Golf Club, which celebrated its centenary in 2006, was home to the Benson and Hedges International Open between 1971 and 1989. During the 1981 tournament, Bernard Langer climbed  up an ash tree by the 17th green to play his third shot. York City F.C. were once based in Fulford, at their Fulfordgate stadium, before moving to the current Bootham Crescent stadium in 1932. The area is now occupied by Eastward Avenue and lies close to Fulford School.

Besides having the Minster Way and the Wilberforce Way, the route of The White Rose Way, a long-distance walk from Leeds to Scarborough also passes through Fulford.

Notable people
Steve McClaren – former England football manager, born in Fulford

Gallery

References

External links

Villages in North Yorkshire
Villages and areas in the City of York
Civil parishes in North Yorkshire